Big Brother: Duplo Impacto (lit. Big Brother: Double Impact) is a special spin-off edition of the Portuguese version of the reality show Big Brother.

The show is co-hosted by Cláudio Ramos and Teresa Guilherme.

On 20 October 2020, it was announced by the presenter and director of Entertainment and Fiction of TVI, Cristina Ferreira, during her show "Dia de Cristina", that there would be a special edition called Big Brother: Duplo Impacto debut in 2021. The best housemates from the fifth season and the sixth season of Big Brother, Secret Story and other reality shows from TVI would enter the Big Brother house.

On 4 December 2020, TVI revealed that the show would premiere on 3 January 2021.

Housemates

Duos

Nominations table 
 – This housemate was the Leader for that week. Also, the decision belonged to the Leader.
 – This decision belonged to guests.
 – This decision belonged to the public.
 – This decision belonged to another housemate(s).
Express vote – A quick vote on the official app to save one nominee, out of two.
Saved & replaced – A nominated housemate who gets saved and is replaced with a non-nominated housemate.

Notes 
: For this season, the housemates were divided into duos, which changed every week (see Duos). In the nominations, the duos nominated and were nominated together. However, the nominees were against public vote individually.
: On Week 1, Joana A. was not in any duo, and hence, she was elected as the Leader, who did not nominate nor could be nominated.
: The original nominees were Gonçalo & Helena, Hélder & Noélia, and Sónia & Teresa. Special guests in the Command Post – season six's finalist Pedro Fonseca and his mother, Maria Antónia – were given the power to save one duo and replace it with another one. They saved Sónia & Teresa and replaced them with Anuska & Bruno.
: The original nominees were Bruno & Joana A., and Noélia & Sandrina. Special guests in the Command Post – Maria Antónia and Secret Story 4 contestant Bernardina Brito – were given the power to save one duo and choose a duo to replace it with another one. They chose to save Bruno & Joana A. and decided to give the replacement power to the duo Joana D. & Sónia, who chose Rui & Teresa to be nominated. 
: On Week 3, the duos from Week 2 remained the same. However, the public was given the power to separate two of them. Bruno & Joana A. and Joana D. & Sónia were separated and played as individual contestants. Also, as Rui was evicted, Teresa was an individual player as well.
: Due to rewards from the Weekly Task, some housemates received a double vote, and their nominations counted as two. In the Yellow Duo, only Gonçalo received this reward and only his nomination (Joana A.) counted as two, while Pedro S.'s (Bruno) counted as one.
:  As new housemates, Bernardina, Pedro F., and Sofia were all supposed to have immunity in Week 5's nominations. However, one of them lost immunity as a punishment for giving information from the outside world to the other housemates. These were asked to vote for who they wanted to lose immunity and Pedro F. received the most votes. Later, he won the Leader competition, but despite that, he was still able to be nominated.
: Four housemates received one box each.  Pedro F. received box number 1 and had to automatically nominate someone; Noélia received box 2 and had to nominate 3 housemates; Joana A. received box 3 and nominated 4 housemates;  Sandrina received box number 4 and was forbidden from nominating.
:  Bruno and Joana A. were automatically nominated by Big Brother.
: Apart from Bruno and Joana A., the remaining nominees were Gonçalo, Sandrina, Sofia, and Sónia. Infiltrated in the Bunker, Ana chose Sandrina and Sónia to be on the Express Vote and one of them would be saved.
: Each housemate took a ball out of a container. The ball that they get would reveal how many people they should nominate or if they would nominate at all. The Leaders nominated two housemates as usual.
:  Gonçalo was automatically nominated for Week 9 for breaking the rules.
: The Leader, Sofia, gave an animal to each housemate. Each animal represented how many people they nominated.
: Without knowing who she was giving the power to, Secret Story 2 runner-up Cátia Palhinha decided whether each housemate would nominate 3 fellow housemates or would nominate just 1 but with the count of two.
:  Bruno won a passport for the Final by winning a quiz.
: Each housemate fought for an envelope which would reveal how they would nominate.
: Edmar, Noélia, and Sofia received the most votes. The usual Express Vote was, exceptionally, opened to decide which of them would be the second finalist. Sofia received 51% of the votes and became the second finalist, while Noélia received 47% and Edmar received 2%.
: For being the first finalist, Bruno was given the power to give a passport for the Final to one of the non-nominees (Jéssica F. or Joana A.), while the other would replace Sofia in the nominations. He gave the passport to Joana A..
: This week, the public voted for who they wanted to win the competition. The fourth placer wins a monetary prize of 2.500€, the third placer wins 5.000€, the runner-up wins 7.500€, and the winner wins 20.000€.

Nominations total received

References

External links
  

Big Brother (Portuguese TV series)